is a Japanese anime series by Nippon Animation.
It is the fourth production in the World Masterpiece Theater series (Calpis Family Theater back then). It is based on the French novel En Famille by Hector Malot. The original aired from January 1, 1978 until December 31, 1978, spanning 53 episodes.

It has been dubbed in several languages for some regions, such as Iran, Portugal, Italy, Spain, Latin America, the Arabic Speaking World, Germany, Thailand, and the Philippines.

A re-edited footage film with some newly re-recorded lines and a new narration was also released in Japan in 1990.

En Famille

The anime is based on the novel En Famille by Hector Malot, which is also translated as Nobody's Girl. Another work by the author, Sans Famille, has a very similar story. That work was used as the basis of an anime film, Chibikko Remi to Meiken Kapi, as well as two separate anime series, Nobody's Boy: Remi and Remi, Nobody's Girl. The latter series should not be confused with The Story of Perrine.

Plot
Perrine Paindavoine is the daughter of an Anglo-Indian mother, Marie, and a French father, Edmond, who dies in Bosnia at the very beginning of the story. Before dying, Edmond asks his wife and Perrine to return to his hometown, Maraucourt, where Perrine's grandfather, Vulfran, owns a factory and a family mansion. Perrine and her mother run a traveling photo studio on their journey to France. Upon reaching Paris, however, Marie falls ill. Although they sell everything they have to spend on medication, Marie eventually dies. On her deathbed, she reveals that Perrine must not expect a welcome from her grandfather. Vulfran strongly opposed Edmond's marriage and as such, he detests Perrine.

After the burial, Perrine embarks on an arduous journey to Maraucourt, traveling almost  on foot and barely surviving starvation. Once there, she assumes the identity of Aurelie to assess the situation in advance: Maraucourt is a town whose primary function is to house the workforce of its cotton mill, which Mr. Paindavoine owns. As such, the blind, stern Mr. Paindavoine is virtually the local ruler of the town and is feared by everyone, even his irresponsible nephew who expects to inherit the factory.

Aurelie secures a job of pushing rail carts in the factory. Soon, however, she is promoted to factory's interpreter, as she speaks both French and English fluently. Ultimately, through her efficiency, loyalty, and (unbeknownst to many) compassion, she becomes Vulfran's personal secretary and is invited to live in his mansion. Vulfran gradually grows fond of Aurelie, who has become his all-time companion without him asking. Coming so close to her grandfather, Aurelie learns about his personal life: Having virtually no loving relative, Vulfran has started a search for Edmond, intent to bring him home. Aurelie translates his foreign communications but does not dare to mention that his search is in vain, because Vulfran makes no secret of his hatred for Edmond's wife and daughter, blaming them for stealing his son away, which hurts Aurelie.

Eventually, Vulfran is informed of the premature death of Edmond in Bosnia. The bad news is proved almost fatal, as Vulfran is struck down by grief and only survives the ordeal through the passionate care of Aurelie, who helps him recover. Vulfran is grateful to Aurelie; during a visit from the elderly "grandmother Françoise", once Edmond's nanny, he proclaims that Aurelie is an angel sent by God to save him because such unconditional love is unique for a total stranger. Françoise, a mutual friend of Aurelie since her arrival in Maraucourt, replies that the angel curiously resembles Edmond. Vulkan immediately sends his lawyer to investigate Aurelie's background and also acknowledges that if she is truly his granddaughter, he must make up for having said terrible things about Edmond's family in front of her.

After receiving confirmation that Aurelie is indeed Perrine, Vulfran undergoes dangerous eye surgery to see his granddaughter's face. He also orders the construction of a daycare center and healthy dormitories for the workers of the factory.

Episodes List 
1 Episode Setting Out

2 Episode A Long Journey

3 Episode Mother's Strength

4 Episode The Rebel Count

5 Episode GrandFather and Grandson

6 Episode Two Mothers

7 Episode The Circus Boy

8 Episode The Drunk Donkey

9 Episode Business Rivals

10 Episode The Camera Thieves

11 Episode Baron Does His Best

12 Episode An Audience of Two

13 Episode Crossing The Alps

14 Episode In A Beautiful Country

15 Episode France! France!

16 Episode Mother's Decision

17 Episode An Inn in Paris

18 Episode The Old Man At The Gate

19 Episode The Boy From Downtown Paris

20 Episode Farewell, Palikare

21 Episode Mother's Last Words

22 Episode Unforgettable Friends

23 Episode Solo Journey

24 Episode A Beautiful Rainbow

25 Episode Palikare! That's My Palikare!

26 Episode Kind Rouquerie-obasan

27 Episode Grandfather's Cold Face

28 Episode Working in Paindavoine Factory

29 Episode A Hut By The Lake

30 Episode All By Herself

31 Episode Perrine's Guests

32 Episode Her Secret Name

33 Episode Theodore's Wallet

34 Episode An Unforgettable Day

35 Episode The English Letters

36 Episode Joy and Anxiety

37 Episode Grandfather's Large Hand

38 Episode Her Lovely Dress

39 Episode A Letter From India

40 Episode Baron's Calamity

41 Episode A Castle-Like Château

42 Episode Rosalie's Sorrow

43 Episode On Sunday' Perrine...

44 Episode A Malicious Woman

45 Episode News From Bosnia

46 Episode Vulfran's Sorrow

47 Episode Aurelie's Face

48 Episode The Fire

49 Episode A Time for Joyful Tears

50 Episode The First Snow of Winter

51 Episode Grandfather's Eyes

52 Episode An Unforgettable Christmas

53 Episode Spring Cometh

Characters

Reception
Since its animation style was unsophisticated, the production was considered as mediocre. But near the end of the production, it became one of the most highly regarded pieces within World Masterpiece Theater.

References

External links 
 

1978 anime television series debuts
1990 anime films
Adventure anime and manga
Drama anime and manga
Hector Malot anime series
Historical anime and manga
Sat.1 original programming
Television shows set in France
World Masterpiece Theater series